Hartwell House may refer to:

in England
 Hartwell House, Buckinghamshire

in the United States
(sorted by state, then city/town)
John S. Hartwell House, Pasadena, CA, listed on the National Register of Historic Places (NRHP) in Los Angeles County, California
Hartwell House (Reading, Massachusetts), NRHP-listed
George H. Hartwell House, Southbridge, Massachusetts, NRHP-listed
Samuel Hartwell House, Lincoln, Massachusetts
Samuel C. Hartwell House, Southbridge, Massachusetts, NRHP-listed
W. W. Hartwell House & Dependencies, Plattsburgh, New York, NRHP-listed